"Someday We'll Look Back"  is a song written and performed by American country music artist Merle Haggard and The Strangers.  It was released in July 1971 as the first single and title track from the album Someday We'll Look Back.  The song peaked at number two on the U.S. Billboard Hot Country Singles chart and peaked at number nineteen on the Bubbling Under Hot 100. It reached number two on the Canadian RPM Country Tracks.

Chart performance

References

1971 singles
1971 songs
Merle Haggard songs
Songs written by Merle Haggard
Song recordings produced by Ken Nelson (American record producer)
Capitol Records singles